Historically, the migratory history of Paraguay has been ambiguous, since it has had periods of large scale emigration as well as large waves of immigrants, primarily from Europe.

Ethnically, Paraguay is considered itself as a white and mestizo country, the result of intermarriage between Amerindians (mainly Guaraní) and Europeans (mostly of Spanish origin). Unlike neighbouring countries like Argentina or Brazil, Paraguay did not attract massive numbers of immigrants, but this does not imply that it has not been a recipient thereof. However, during the 19th century the country suffered a devastating war that greatly reduced its population, having to rise from the ashes and repopulate their territory with the help of immigrants.

During the 20th century, Paraguay became a recipient of immigrants, especially Europeans fleeing wars occurring in the Old World, in search of a better life quality and peace. Among European groups in the country, this includes those of Spanish, German (many of them being Mennonites), Italian, French and Slavic origin. Other groups included these of Levantine/Arabs roots (mostly Lebanese and Syrians) and East Asians (such as the Chinese and Japanese), among others.

Today, immigration to Paraguay has not ceased, but the places of origin of the newcomers have changed. According to the 2002 census, 84,2% of immigrants in Paraguay come from Brazil and Argentina.

History 
The first Europeans to arrive in what is now Paraguayan territory were Spaniards who left a palpable cultural heritage even today.

The government of Carlos Antonio López was marked by a period of international openness including immigration and attracting settlers to populate the country.

Settlement in the Paraguayan Chaco 

Geographically, Paraguay can be divided into two parts: The Chaco or Western Region, and the Eastern Region, where Asunción is located, as well as the other main cities of the country. The Chaco is the largest region by area with about 60% of the total territory but, on the other hand, it is the least populated region being home to less than 2% of the total population. Because of this, one of the main goals of the government of Paraguay was to populate this vast and immense region, which comprises the departments of Presidente Hayes, Boquerón, and Alto Paraguay (also known in English as Upper Paraguay). The colonisation of the Chaco begins with the founding of several colonies, including Nueva Burdeos (present-day Villa Hayes), which was founded by French immigrants. The first settlers came to this colony through the port of Asunción in 1856.

Figures

See also 

 Demographics of Paraguay

References 

 
Society of Paraguay